Finly Hutchinson Gray (July 21, 1863 – May 8, 1947) was an American lawyer and politician who served two separate three-term stints as a U.S. Representative from Indiana in the early 20th century.

Biography
Born near Orange, Indiana, Gray attended the common schools.
He studied law.
He was admitted to the bar in 1892 and commenced practice in Connersville, Indiana.
He served as mayor of Connersville 1904 – 1910.

Congress 
Gray was elected as a Democrat to the Sixty-second, Sixty-third, and Sixty-fourth Congresses (March 4, 1911 – March 3, 1917).
He was an unsuccessful candidate for reelection in 1916 to the Sixty-fifth Congress and for election in 1917 to fill the vacancy in the same Congress caused by the death of Daniel W. Comstock.
He resumed the practice of law and also engaged in lecturing.

Gray was again elected to the Seventy-third, Seventy-fourth, and Seventy-fifth Congresses (March 4, 1933 – January 3, 1939).
He was an unsuccessful candidate for reelection in 1938 to the Seventy-sixth Congress.

Later career and death 
Reengaged in the practice of law in Connersville, Indiana.  He and his wife restored the Canal House and resided there from 1936 to 1947.  It later housed the local chapter of the Veterans of Foreign Wars and is now a local history museum.
He resided at Connersville until his death there on May 8, 1947.
He was interred in Dale Cemetery.  The Canal House was added to the National Register of Historic Places in 1973.

Finley Hutchinson Gray married Mary Alice Green and they had a daughter Mary Gray. Mary Gray preceded her mother in death. She was born in 1903 and in the 1930 census is a patient at the Madison Hospital for the Insane in Madison, Jefferson County, IN.

Mary Gray Bird Sanctuary in Fayette County IN: website states: The Mary Gray Bird Sanctuary is owned and operated by the Indiana Audubon Society and is located south of Connersville in Fayette County.

Alice Green Gray gave the initial  property to the Indiana Audubon Society in 1943 as a living memorial to her daughter’ Mary, who preceded her in death.

References

1863 births
1947 deaths
Mayors of places in Indiana
Democratic Party members of the United States House of Representatives from Indiana
People from Fayette County, Indiana
People from Connersville, Indiana